Profundimonas is a Gram-negative, facultatively anaerobic and heterotroph bacteria genus. It is in  the family of Oceanospirillaceae. It has one known species, Profundimonas piezophila. The species was isolated from deep seawater from Puerto Rico.

References

Oceanospirillales
Monotypic bacteria genera
Bacteria genera